Adam Bennett Schiff (born June 22, 1960) is an American lawyer, author, and politician serving as a U.S. representative from California since 2001. A member of the Democratic Party, Schiff was a member of the California State Senate from 1996 to 2000.

Born in Massachusetts, Schiff attended high school in the Bay Area and holds degrees from Stanford University and Harvard University. He began his career as a law clerk and assistant U.S. attorney in California. He served two terms in the California State Senate before being elected in 2000 to the U.S. House of Representatives, where he is serving his 12th term.

Schiff represents California's 30th congressional district, which is centered in the San Gabriel Valley east of Los Angeles and includes Pasadena, Glendale, Burbank, West Hollywood, and the Los Angeles neighborhoods of Hollywood, Sunland-Tujunga, Edendale, Park La Brea, Hancock Park, and Echo Park. He is a candidate for the United States Senate in the 2024 election to succeed Dianne Feinstein.

Schiff chaired the House Intelligence Committee from 2019 to 2023 and was removed from it by Speaker Kevin McCarthy in 2023. He is on leave from the House Appropriations Committee, which he joined in 2007. He previously served on the House Foreign Affairs Committee.

Early life and education
Schiff was born in Framingham, Massachusetts, the son of Edward and Sherrill Ann (née Glovsky) Schiff. He was raised in a Jewish family that moved to Scottsdale, Arizona, in 1970 and Alamo, California, in 1972. In 1978, he graduated from Monte Vista High School in Danville, California, where he played soccer and was both the class salutatorian and the student his peers voted "most likely to succeed".

Schiff received a Bachelor of Arts degree in political science from Stanford University in 1982 and graduated with distinction. He obtained his Juris Doctor from Harvard Law School cum laude in 1985. Schiff was a member of the Harvard Law School Forum; his tasks included driving guest speakers (including William J. Brennan Jr.) from the airport to campus and back. He also worked as a student research assistant for Professor Laurence Tribe.

Law career
After law school, Schiff spent a year as a law clerk for Judge William Matthew Byrne Jr. of the United States District Court for the Central District of California. From 1987 to 1993, he was an Assistant United States Attorney in the Office of the United States Attorney for the Central District of California. In this position, Schiff came to public attention when he prosecuted the case against Richard Miller, a former FBI agent who spied for the Soviet Union. The first trial resulted in a hung jury; the second trial resulted in a conviction that was overturned on appeal. Miller was convicted in a third trial.

In May 1994, Schiff was a candidate for the 43rd district seat in the California State Assembly in a special election and lost to Republican nominee James E. Rogan. That November, he was the unsuccessful Democratic nominee for a full term, again losing to Rogan.

California State Senate

In 1996, Schiff was elected to represent the 21st district in the California State Senate. When his term began, he was the Senate's youngest member, at 36. During his four-year term, Schiff chaired the senate's Judiciary Committee and Select Committee on Juvenile Justice, and the state legislature's Joint Committee on the Arts.

As a state senator, Schiff authored dozens of measures that were enacted into law. These included Senate Bill 1847, Chapter 1021. Passed in 1998, this legislation continued work on the stalled Blue Line light rail extension to Pasadena by renaming the Blue Line the Gold Line and creating the Foothill Gold Line Construction Authority, which separated the project from the Los Angeles County Metropolitan Transportation Authority. The construction authority finished the Pasadena line in 2003 and extended it to Azusa in 2016. A third leg was begun, which is intended to extend the line to Pomona by 2025. Schiff's work to re-energize the project caused him to be regarded in the San Gabriel Valley as the "Father of the Gold Line".

During his tenure, he had also authored "tough on crime" measures, which did not pass or were vetoed by both Republican and Democratic governors, including a bill which would have allowed minors 14 year olds or older accused of serious crimes to be tried as adults, as well as a bill which would have made it a felony to hire an undocumented immigrant. Nonetheless, The Guardian noted that these proposals were in line with the aforementioned "tough on crime" attitude of other politicians in the late 1990s.

U.S. House of Representatives

Elections 

In 2000, Schiff challenged Rogan, then the incumbent, in what was then California's 27th congressional district. The district had once been a Republican stronghold but had been trending Democratic since the early 1990s. In what was the most expensive House race ever at the time, Schiff unseated Rogan, taking 53% of the vote to Rogan's 44%. He became only the second Democrat to represent this district since its creation in 1913.

After the 2000 census, the district was renumbered the 29th and made significantly more Democratic. As a result, Schiff has never faced another contest nearly as close as his 2000 bid, and has been reelected 11 times. His district became even more Democratic after the 2010 census, when it was renumbered the 28th and pushed into Los Angeles proper. Even before that, none of his Republican challengers had cleared 35% of the vote.

In 2010, Schiff defeated Tea Party–backed Republican John Colbert for a sixth term. In 2012, he defeated Republican Phil Jennerjahn. In 2014, he defeated independent candidate Steve Stokes. In 2016, he defeated Republican candidate Lenore Solis.

In 2018, Schiff initially competed in the primary with Democratic challenger Kim Gruenenfelder. After Gruenenfelder dropped out of the race, Schiff defeated Republican nominee Johnny Nalbandian.

In 2020, Schiff faced a crowded primary, which included Republican attorney Eric Early and Democratic drag queen Maebe A. Girl. He won the primary with a majority of the vote, with Girl and Early in a close race for second. Early was finally determined to have advanced to the general election on March 27, 2020. Schiff easily won the general election.

After the 2020 census, Schiff's district was renumbered the 30th and made more Democratic. In January 2022, Schiff announced he would run for reelection in the new 30th district. He defeated Girl with 71% of the vote.

In lieu of running for a 13th term, Schiff is running to succeed Dianne Feinstein in the United States Senate in 2024.

Tenure

2003 invasion of Iraq
Schiff voted in favor of the 2003 invasion of Iraq. In February 2015, discussing how or whether to tailor Bush-era plans from 2001 and 2002 to fight ISIS, Schiff was asked if he regretted voting to invade. He said: "Absolutely. Unfortunately, our intelligence was dead wrong on that, on Saddam at that time. The vote set in motion a cascading series of events which have [had] disastrous consequences."

Armenian genocide resolution
Schiff has been a leading voice in Armenian-American issues; he claims to have over 70,000 Armenian-Americans in his district. He introduced U.S. House Resolution 106, recognizing the Armenian genocide, which the House Foreign Affairs Committee approved on October 11, 2007, but began to lose support after Turkey's prime minister said that approval of the resolution would endanger U.S.–Turkey relations. On March 4, 2010, the House Foreign Affairs Committee again approved the resolution by a 23–22 margin. Immediately, the Turkish government recalled its U.S. ambassador. Schiff said in 2007, "When you think about what we have against us – the president, a foreign policy establishment that has condoned this campaign of denial, the Turkish lobby – against that you have the truth, which is a powerful thing but doesn't always win out". On October 29, 2019, the full House of Representatives passed the resolution by a vote of 405–11.

Helicopter noise
Beginning with Representative Howard Berman before Berman was voted out, Schiff worked on the Helicopter Noise Relief Act, a measure to reduce unwanted helicopter noise across Los Angeles County by authorizing the Federal Aviation Administration (FAA) to study and regulate it. After reintroducing his legislation, Schiff worked with Senator Dianne Feinstein to push the FAA to act, and together they attached a provision in the 2014 omnibus appropriations package directing the U.S. Secretary of Transportation and the FAA to address helicopter noise in Los Angeles County. As a result, in 2015 the FAA created a countywide helicopter noise public complaint system, the first step toward regulation.

Intelligence and surveillance reform
Schiff has been a prominent supporter of surveillance reforms, especially in the wake of the leaks of classified intelligence by Edward Snowden. In 2007, in response to disclosure of the Terrorist Surveillance Program, Schiff and Representative Jeff Flake offered a successful amendment in the House of Representatives to clarify that the Foreign Intelligence Surveillance Act is the exclusive means for collecting foreign intelligence information within the U.S. Schiff has criticized the bulk collection of telephone metadata by the National Security Agency. In January 2014, he introduced the Telephone Metadata Reform Act, which would prohibit the bulk collection of domestic phone records. Schiff has also introduced several bills aimed at reforming the Foreign Intelligence Surveillance Court, including a bill to require outside counsel to be appointed to argue for privacy and civil liberties protections in certain cases before the Court.

Investigation of Benghazi attack
Nancy Pelosi appointed Schiff to the House Select Committee on Benghazi in 2014 as one of the five Democrats on the committee. He had participated in the House Permanent Select Committee on Intelligence investigation into the attacks on the Benghazi diplomatic compound, which found that the initial talking points the intelligence community provided were flawed but not intended to deceive, and that diplomatic facilities across the world lacked adequate security. The report's findings were unanimous and bipartisan. Before he was appointed to the Benghazi Select Committee, Schiff called the establishment of a select committee to investigate the 2012 attack a "colossal waste of time" and said Democratic leaders should not appoint any members, stating: "I think it's just a tremendous red herring and a waste of taxpayer resources". Despite those reservations, he still accepted an appointment to the Committee because if he felt he "could add value, [he] would serve".

Press freedom
In 2006, Schiff formed the bipartisan, bicameral Congressional Caucus for the Freedom of the Press, aimed at advancing press freedom around the world. The Caucus proposed the Daniel Pearl Freedom of the Press Act, originally introduced to Congress by Schiff, Representative Mike Pence, and Senator Christopher Dodd on October 1, 2009, in response to the murder of Daniel Pearl by terrorists in Pakistan. The legislation requires the United States Department of State to expand its scrutiny of news media intimidation and freedom of the press restrictions during its annual report on human rights in each country. After its introduction, the act passed the House by a vote of 403 to 12 and unanimously in the Senate; however, the Senate removed a provision requiring the Secretary of State (in coordination with the Department of State's Bureau of Democracy, Human Rights and Labor, and in consultation with the Undersecretary for Public Affairs and Public Diplomacy) to establish a grant program aiming to promote freedom of the press worldwide. On May 17, 2010, President Barack Obama, accompanied by the Pearl family, signed the act into law.

Saudi Arabian-led intervention in Yemen
In 2015, Schiff supported the Saudi Arabian-led intervention in Yemen, saying: "The military action by Saudi Arabia and its partners was necessitated by the illegal action of the Houthi rebels and their Iranian backers. ... But ultimately, a negotiated end to this crisis is the only way to restore order in Yemen and shrink the space for terrorism".

In April 2019, Schiff voted for a bipartisan resolution under the War Powers Act to end U.S. involvement in the war. It passed the Senate, but after passing the House it was vetoed.

War authorization reform and authorization against ISIS
After President Obama's speech at the National Defense University examining the U.S. war powers during the War on Terror, Schiff introduced bipartisan legislation to repeal the 2001 Authorization for Use of Military Force Against Terrorists, the legislation passed in the days after the September 11 attacks to combat al-Qaeda, because he felt that "the current AUMF is outdated and straining at the edges to justify the use of force outside the war theater". The bill, introduced with Representative Tom Rooney, was intended to sunset. In addition to his legislation, Schiff has been a forceful proponent of debating and voting on a new war authorization against the Islamic State of Iraq and the Levant.

Schiff has been a very prominent supporter of national defense spending, voting for every increase in the defense budget over the course of his career.

Comments on Trump–Russia collusion investigation

In a March 22, 2017, interview with Chuck Todd on MSNBC, Schiff claimed there was "more than circumstantial evidence now" that Donald Trump's 2016 presidential campaign colluded with Russia. Todd followed up by asking if he had seen direct evidence of collusion and Schiff responded that there was "evidence that is not circumstantial and is very much worthy of investigation".

On April 2, 2017, Schiff, the ranking member on the House Select Intelligence Committee, which is tasked with conducting inquiries related to Russian interference in the 2016 United States elections, appeared on CNN's State of the Union. In the wide-ranging interview, Schiff and host Jake Tapper discussed Michael Flynn's request for immunity, Schiff's and Devin Nunes's separate inspections of White House documents, Trump's allegations of wiretapping in Trump Tower, and Nunes's apparent close association with the Trump White House. Tapper asked Schiff if there was evidence of Donald Trump–Russia collusion. Schiff replied: "I don't think we can say anything definitively at this point. We are still at the very early stage of the investigation. The only thing I can say is that it would be irresponsible for us not to get to the bottom of this". Tapper asked, "Do you think that Chairman Nunes was part of an attempt to provide some sort of cover for the president's claim about Obama wiretapping him at Trump Tower, which, obviously, this does not prove, but to cover for that, or an attempt to distract, as you're suggesting?" Schiff replied, "It certainly is an attempt to distract and to hide the origin of the materials, to hide the White House hand. The question is, of course, why? And I think the answer to the question is this effort to point the Congress in other directions, basically say, don't look at me, don't look at Russia, there is nothing to see here". A few days later, Nunes recused himself as leader of the investigative panel while the House Committee on Ethics investigated whether he had disclosed classified information.

On July 23, 2017, on Meet the Press, Schiff stated: "[A]t the end of the day we need to make sure that our president is operating not in his personal best interests and not because he's worried about what the Russians might have but because what he is doing is in America's best interest. The fact that we have questions about this is in itself harmful". The following morning on Twitter, Trump called Schiff "Sleazy Adam Schiff, the totally biased Congressman looking into 'Russia'" and called the Russian collusion investigation "the Dem loss excuse". Schiff responded on Twitter that the president's "comments and actions are beneath the dignity of the office".

In December 2018, Schiff suggested that Trump associate Roger Stone might have lied to Congress, and said the transcript of his testimony should be forwarded to the Special Counsel. Stone hit back, saying Schiff was "a con man." In November 2019, Stone was convicted of lying to Congress.

When he became chair of the House Intelligence Committee in 2019, Schiff took a personal mission to investigate Trump's connections to Russia, separate from the Special Counsel investigation. Schiff came under fire when he demurred when asked if he would accept it if the Special Counsel's investigation concluded that Trump had not colluded with Russia, saying that he had great confidence in Mueller but that "there may be, for example, evidence of collusion or conspiracy that is clear and convincing, but not proof beyond a reasonable doubt," as is needed for a criminal conviction.

On March 28, 2019, the nine Republican members of the House Intelligence Committee officially called for Schiff to resign due to his allegations that Trump's campaign colluded with Russians in the 2016 election. Schiff responded by accusing the Republican members of tolerating "immoral" and "corrupt" conduct by Trump campaign members and administration appointees.

North Korea
Schiff called North Korea "one of the most brutal and despotic regimes in the world". After the death of American student Otto Warmbier, who was imprisoned during a visit to North Korea, Schiff said, "The barbaric treatment of Otto Warmbier by the North Korean regime amounts to the murder of a U.S. citizen".

In April 2018, asked whether he thought Trump deserved at least partial credit for North Korea's involvement in talks with the U.S., Schiff responded: "I think it's more than fair to say that the combination of the president's unpredictability and indeed his bellicosity had something to do with the North Koreans deciding to come to the negotiating table".

Israel and antisemitism 

Schiff is a supporter of Israel. In December 2016, he urged Obama to veto UN Security Council Resolution 2334, which condemned Israeli settlement building in the occupied Palestinian territories as a violation of international law.

In February 2019, Representative Ilhan Omar tweeted, "It's all about the Benjamins baby" in reference to American politicians' support for Israel and invoked the American Israel Public Affairs Committee (AIPAC). The tweet received widespread bipartisan condemnation, including from many Democratic leaders as well as Schiff, for implying that lobby money was fueling American politicians' support of Israel. Schiff said it was "never acceptable to give voice to, or repeat, anti-Semitic smears".

Murder of Jamal Khashoggi
After news reports that the CIA concluded that Saudi Crown Prince Mohammed bin Salman had ordered the assassination of Saudi journalist Jamal Khashoggi, Trump said there was insufficient CIA evidence to link bin Salman to the murder. The top Democrat on the House intelligence committee, Schiff was briefed by the CIA on the agency assessment, and stated afterward that Trump was being dishonest about the CIA findings.

Impeachments

In 2009, Schiff was appointed and served as an impeachment manager (prosecutor) in the impeachment trial of Judge Samuel B. Kent. He was the lead manager alongside Bob Goodlatte. The next year, Schiff was appointed and served as an impeachment manager in the impeachment trial of Judge Thomas Porteous. He was again the lead manager alongside Goodlatte. 

As chair of the Intelligence Committee, Schiff was one of the lead investigators in the impeachment inquiry against Donald Trump stemming from the Trump–Ukraine scandal. Trump was impeached along party lines by 228 votes to 193 in the House on December 18, 2019, making him the third president to be impeached.

On January 15, 2020, House Speaker Nancy Pelosi named Schiff a lead impeachment manager. In this role, he led a team of seven House members responsible for presenting the impeachment case against Trump during his trial before the United States Senate.

Armenia–Azerbaijan War 

Schiff accused Turkey of inciting the conflict between Armenia and Azerbaijan over the disputed region of Nagorno-Karabakh. He stated that the 2020 Nagorno-Karabakh war "must cause us [to] reexamine our relationship with both Turkey and Azerbaijan. If an ally of the United States is recruiting fighters from Syria to encourage further bloodshed and murder of civilians, what kind of ally are they in NATO or otherwise?". Schiff co-signed a letter to Secretary of State Mike Pompeo stating: "We write to express our deep concern with Azerbaijan's renewed aggression against Artsakh (Nagorno Karabakh) and the rising possibility of a wider conflict with Armenia. We ask that the Administration use all available diplomatic tools to reduce tensions, end the fighting, and restrain Azerbaijan from further offensive actions." Schiff called for U.S. recognition of the separatist, self-declared Republic of Artsakh, which is officially part of Azerbaijan, but has been under control of ethnic Armenian forces backed by Armenia since the end of a separatist war in 1994.

Investigation into the January 6 attack on the Capitol 

On July 1, 2021, Pelosi appointed eight members (seven Democrats and two Republicans) to the Select Committee to Investigate the January 6 Attack on the United States Capitol, which included Schiff.

On June 21, 2022, Schiff led Day 4 of the committee's public hearings, which included testimony from three Republican officials to whom Trump reached out after the election: Georgia Secretary of State Brad Raffensperger, his deputy Gabe Sterling, and Arizona House of Representatives Speaker Rusty Bowers. The second half of the hearing focused on the emotional impact on a Georgia poll worker and her family of harassment and threats by Trump supporters, to the point of quitting her job and going into hiding.	
	
Schiff was interviewed after the hearing by reporters and called the testimony "enormously powerful". He added, "The lie lives on, and with it so does the danger."

Committee assignments 
 Permanent Select Committee on Intelligence 
Schiff served as ranking member from 2017 to 2019 and as chair from 2019 to 2023.
In January 2023, Speaker Kevin McCarthy expelled Schiff and Eric Swalwell from this committee. 
 House Appropriations Committee (on leave)

Caucus memberships
 Co-chair of the Congressional International Anti-Piracy Caucus
 Co-founded the Democratic Study Group on National Security
 Co-founded the Congressional Caucus for Freedom of the Press
 Vice Chairman of the Congressional LGBT Equality Caucus
 New Democrat Coalition
 House Baltic Caucus
 Congressional Arts Caucus
 Afterschool Caucuses
 Congressional Asian Pacific American Caucus

2021 bid to replace outgoing Attorney General of California 
In early December 2020, then-President elect Joe Biden announced he would nominate Attorney General of California Xavier Becerra for Secretary of Health and Human Services. Axios reported in February 2021 that Schiff was lobbying Governor Newsom and his allies to appoint him as Attorney General, with the approval from Speaker Nancy Pelosi. In response, 36 criminal and social justice groups, notably the Black Lives Matter Los Angeles and Long Beach chapters, wrote an open letter to Newsom expressing "strong opposition" to Schiff's appointment, citing his record allegedly trending toward being more "tough on crime", though they also specified that their letter was not an endorsement of the other potential candidates.

On 24 March 2021, after Becerra was sworn in as the new secretary, Newsom announced he would instead appoint California state assemblyman Rob Bonta as Attorney General of California, and he assumed office on April 23, 2021.

2024 U.S. Senate campaign 

On January 26, 2023, Schiff announced his candidacy for the United States Senate in the 2024 election. On February 2, 2023, Schiff was endorsed by Nancy Pelosi, not long before incumbent Dianne Feinstein announced she would not seek reelection. On February 14, 2023, Feinstein confirmed that she would retire in 2024.

Schiff is expected to run against Representative Katie Porter in the primary. Representative Barbara Lee has also filed for the seat and Representative Ro Khanna has expressed interest in the race.

Electoral history

California's 21st State Senate district

California's 27th congressional district

California's 29th congressional district

California's 28th congressional district

Personal life 

Schiff met his wife, Eve Sanderson, on a tennis court in 1990. They married in 1995 and have two children together.

Schiff and his family live in Burbank. He is Jewish.

Schiff has participated in multiple endurance challenges, including triathlons and marathons. He was the only U.S. representative to participate in the inaugural Washington, D.C., triathlon in 2010 and has since participated in races in Philadelphia, New York City, and Malibu. In 2014, Schiff was the first member of Congress to participate in the AIDS/LifeCycle, a seven-day charity bike ride from San Francisco to Los Angeles to raise awareness and funding to fight HIV and AIDS.

The New Yorker reported in 2018 that "Schiff has been writing screenplays on the side for years", including a murder mystery, a post-Holocaust story, and a spy drama. In October 2021, Schiff published Midnight in Washington: How We Almost Lost Our Democracy and Still Could, a book recounting the effects of the Trump presidency.

Books 
 Midnight in Washington (2021)

See also

 List of current members of the United States House of Representatives
 List of United States representatives from California

References

External links

 Congressman Adam Schiff official U.S. House website
 Adam Schiff for Congress
 

 Adam Schiff at NPR.org (October 2019)
 
 Column archives at The Guardian
 
 Join California Adam Schiff

|-

|-

|-

|-

|-

|-

1960 births
20th-century American lawyers
20th-century American politicians
21st-century American memoirists
21st-century American politicians
American Jews from California
Assistant United States Attorneys
California lawyers
Democratic Party California state senators
Democratic Party members of the United States House of Representatives from California
Harvard Law School alumni
Jewish American attorneys
Jewish members of the United States House of Representatives
Living people
People from Alamo, California
People from Burbank, California
People from Framingham, Massachusetts
Stanford University alumni
Trump–Ukraine scandal
Members of the United States Congress stripped of committee assignment
Candidates in the 2024 United States Senate elections